FUJIWARA is a Japanese comedy duo (kombi) consisting of Toshifumi Fujimoto (藤本 敏史) and Takayuki Haranishi (原西 孝幸). They are from Osaka, but are currently primarily active in Tokyo and, like most other comedians originating the Kansai region, are employed by Yoshimoto Kōgyō.

Members 
 Born December 18, 1970 in Neyagawa, Osaka. Plays the tsukkomi. Known for his large face, a running joke is to have someone say, "Is it just me or does this studio feel small?" to which he responds, "It's because my face is huge." Fujimoto is known as a rowdy-type character and is usually cast in variety shows as such. He was married to model and tarento Yukina Kinoshita from 2010 to 2019. The pair divorced on December 31, 2019.
 Born March 5, 1971 in Neyagawa, Osaka. Plays the boke. His main shtick is delivering one-liner jokes, of which he claims to have 200. His gags often consist of puns and are usually accompanied by absurd gestures. He is often compared to a gorilla in a comedic sense due to his facial features.

Overview 
The name FUJIWARA comes from their names, "Fuji"moto and "Hara"nishi, which when put together is pronounced Fujiwara. When the duo was first formed, they used the kanji "藤原", but later changed it to the English spelling of FUJIWARA.
Fujimoto writes all of the duo's material and routines except for the solo gags that Haranishi performs.
After their marriage in 2010, Fujimoto alongside Yukina Kinoshita have become one of the most well known entertainer couples in the industry. They have appeared several times together on programs such as Monitoring.
They got divorced end of December in 2019.

Shows

Hosted shows
Fujiyama Star (フジヤマ☆スタア) (Kansai TC, since 2007)
Fujiken (フジケン) (SKY PerfecTV!, since 2004)

Semi-regular shows
FUJIWARA are regular guests on the following shows:
Akashiya-san Channel (明石家さんちゃんねる) (TBS, since 2006)
Quiz! Hexagon II (クイズ!ヘキサゴンII) (Fuji Television, since 2006)
LINCOLN (リンカーン) (TBS, since 2005)
Mecha-Mecha Iketeru! (めちゃ²イケるッ!) (Fuji Television, since 1996)

Guest appearances
Smile PreCure! (Appearance in episode 17, 2012)

References

External links
Yoshimoto Kōgyō's profile on FUJIWARA

Japanese comedy duos
People from Neyagawa, Osaka
Japanese YouTube groups